Stephen Avenue Place, formerly Scotia Centre is an office and retail hub in downtown Calgary, Alberta, Canada. Located at 700 2nd Street SW, it stands at 155 metres (509 feet) or 41-storeys tall and was the tallest building in Calgary at the time of its completion.

Formerly known as the Scotia Centre, after its namesake tenant Scotiabank, the building was purchased by Slate Asset Management in 2018 and was extensively renovated.

Stephen Avenue Place is named for George Stephen, the first Baron Mount Stephen, who was the visionary, businessman and financier behind the creation of the Canadian Pacific Railway, and is the namesake of the adjacent Stephen Avenue.

See also

List of tallest buildings in Calgary

References

External links

 Stephen Avenue Place

S
Skyscrapers in Calgary
International style architecture in Canada
Skyscraper office buildings in Canada
Retail buildings in Canada
Commercial buildings completed in 1976